Codringtonia neocrassa is a species of air-breathing land snail, a terrestrial pulmonate gastropod mollusc in the family Helicidae, the typical snails.

Geographic distribution
The native distribution of C. neocrassa includes southern Albania and north-western Greece (western Epirus and Corfu).

References

Codringtonia
Molluscs of Europe
Fauna of Albania
Gastropods described in 1952